The 1961 season was the 56th season of competitive football in Norway.

Hovedserien

Group A

Group B

Championship final
June 16: Fredrikstad - Eik 2 - 0

Bronze final
June 14: Vålerengen - Lyn 6 - 4

Landsdelsserien

Group Østland/Søndre

Group Østland/Nordre

Group Sørland/Vestland, A

Group Sørland/Vestland, B

Group Sørland/Vestland, C

Group Møre

Group Trøndelag

Play-off Sørland/Vestland
Brann - Ulf 1-1
Ulf - Start 2-2
Start - Brann 1-3

Play-off Møre/Trøndelag
Langevåg - Steinkjer 3-3
Steinkjer - Langevåg 3-2 (agg. 6-5)

Steinkjer promoted

Relegation play-off
Våg- Vigør 0 - 5 (in Vennesla)

Våg relegated

Third division

District I
 1. Østsiden        	(Promoted)
 2. Tistedalen
 3. Hafslund
 4. Tune
 5. Sprint/Jeløy
 6. Navestad
 7. Gresvik
 8. Ørje

District II, group A
 1. Vestfossen      		(Play-off)
 2. Drafn
 3. Åssiden
 4. Sagene
 5. Røa
 6. Liull
 7. Fossekallen
 8. Spartacus

District II, group B
 1. Aurskog         		(Play-off)
 2. Drammens BK
 3. Kongsvinger
 4. Slemmestad
 5. Grue
 6. Strømsgodset
 7. Kjelsås
 8. Sterling

District III, group A (Oplandene)
 1. Hamarkameratene 	(Play-off)
 2. Kapp
 3. Hamar IL
 4. Lena
 5. Brumunddal
 6. Gjøvik SK
 7. Mesna
 8. Einastrand

District III, group B1 (Sør-Østerdal)
 1. Ytre Rendal     	(Play-off)
 2. Trysilgutten
 3. Elverum
 4. Nordre Trysil
 5. Koppang
 6. Nybergsund
 7. Innsats

District III, group B2 (Sør-Gudbrandsdal)
 1. Kvam            	(Play-off)
 2. Faaberg
 3. Fåvang
 4. Follebu
 5. Vinstra
 6. Sør-Fron 		(withdrew)

District III, group B3 (Nord-Gudbrandsdal)
 Lesja           (Play-off)

Table unknown.

District IV, group A (Vestfold)
 1. Runar           		(Play-off)
 2. Holmestrand
 3. Tønsberg Turn
 4. Falk
 5. Flint
 6. Tønsebergkam.
 7. Borre
 8. Teie

District IV, group B (Grenland)
 1. Skiens-Grane    		(Play-off)
 2. Urædd
 3. Herkules
 4. Borg
 5. Brevik
 6. Kragerø
 7. Gjerpen
 8. Langesund

District IV, group B (Øvre Telemark)
 1. Heddal          		(Play-off)
 2. Snøgg
 3. Drangedal
 4. Gvarv
 5. Rjukan
 6. Ulefoss

District V, group A1 (Aust-Agder)
 1. Grane (Arendal) 		(Play-off)
 2. Risør
 3. Rygene
 4. Dristug
 5. Arendals BK
 6. Mykland 			(withdrew)

District V, group A2 (Vest-Agder)
 1. Vigør           		(Play-off)
 2. Donn
 3. Mandalskam.
 4. Giv Akt
 5. Torridal
 6. Farsund

District V, group B1 (Rogaland)
 1. Buøy            		(Play-off)
 2. Nærbø
 3. Varhaug
 4. Hinna
 5. Ålgård
 6. Figgjo
 7. Riska

District V, group B2 (Rogaland)
 1. Randaberg       		(Play-off)
 2. Klepp
 3. Kopervik
 4. Sola
 5. Vaulen
 6. Torvastad
 7. Orre

District V, group C (Sunnhordland)
 1. Stord           		(Play-off)
 2. Odda
 3. Fonna
 4. Rubbestadnes
 5. Solid
 6. Tyssedal 			(withdrew)

District VI, group A (Bergen)
 1. Djerv           		(Play-off)
 2. Nymark
 3. Fjellkameratene
 4. Laksevåg
 5. Sandviken
 6. Hardy
 7. Bergens-Sparta

District VI, group B (Midthordland)
 1. Arna            		(Play-off)
 2. Erdal
 3. Voss
 4. Follese
 5. Kjøkkelvik
 6. Florvåg
 7. Osterøy

District VII, group A (Sunnmøre)
 1. Skarbøvik       		(Play-off)
 2. Velled./Ringen
 3. Rollon
 4. Aksla
 5. Ørsta
 6. Hovdebygda
 7. Volda
 8. Brattvåg

District VII, group B (Romsdal)
 1. Træff           		(Play-off)
 2. Åndalsnes
 3. Nord-Gossen
 4. Eidsvåg (Romsdal)
 5. Isfjorden
 6. Frode
 7. Eide

District VII, group C (Nordmøre)
 1. Clausenengen    		(Play-off)
 2. Dahle
 3. Todalen
 4. Sunndal
 5. Nordlandet
 6. Bøfjord
 7. Goma
 8. Tingvoll 			(withdrew)

District VIII, group A (Sør-Trøndelag)
 1. Troll           			(Play-off)
 2. Løkken
 3. Orkanger
 4. Svorkmo
 5. Leik
 6. Orkdal
 7. Melhus
 8. Støren 			(withdrew)

District VIII, group B (Trondheim og omegn)
 1. Ranheim         		(Play-off)
 2. Tryggkameratene
 3. Nidelv
 4. National
 5. Trond
 6. Vestbyen
 7. Wing
 8. Trondheims/Ørn

District VIII, group C (Fosen)
 1. Brekstad        		(Play-off)
 2. Fevåg
 3. Hasselvika
 4. Beian
 5. Opphaug
 6. Bjugn
 7. Stadsbygd 		(withdrew)

District VIII, group D (Nord-Trøndelag/Namdal)
 1. Verdal          		(Play-off)
 2. Neset
 3. Stjørdals/Blink
 4. Bangsund
 5. Namsos
 6. Snåsa
 7. Henning
 8. Malm

District IX
 1. Bodø/Glimt
 2. Mo
 3. Stålkameratene
 4. Brønnøysund
 5. Sandnessjøen
 6. Mosjøen

District X
 1. Mjølner
 2. Harstad
 3. Narvik/Nor
 4. Andenes
 5. Tromsø
 6. Lia-Brage

Play-off District II
Aurskog - Vestfossen 1-2
Vestfossen - Aurskog 1-3 (agg. 3-4)

Aurskog promoted.

Play-off District III
 1. Ytre Rendal    		(Play-off)
 - - - - - - - - - - - - - - - - - - -
 2. Kvam
 3. Lesja

Ytre Rendal - Hamarkameratene 0-1
Hamarkameratene - Ytre Rendal 4-1 (agg. 5-1)

Hamarkameratene promoted

Play-off District IV
Runar - Skiens-Grane 5-3
Heddal - Runar 1-1
Skiens-Grane - Heddal 0-3

Play-off District V
Vigør - Grane 3 - 1
Grane - Vigør 4 - 2 (agg. 5 - 5)
Grane - Vigør 3 - 1 (in Grimstad)

Grane (Arendal) promoted

Våg - Vigør 0 - 5 (in Vennesla)

Vigør promoted

Buøy - Randaberg 0 - 0
Randaberg - Buøy 4 - 0 (agg. 4 - 0)

Randaberg promoted

Buøy - Stord 5 - 0 (in Haugesund)

Buøy promoted

Championship District V
Grane - Randaberg (not played)

Play-off District VI
Arne - Djerv 1 - 1
Djerv - Arna 12 - 0 (agg. 13 - 1)

Djerv promoted

Play-off District VII
Træff - Clausenengen 0 - 9
Skarbøvik - Træff 3 - 0
Clausenengen - Skarbøvik 3 - 2

Play-off District VIII
Brekstad - Verdal 0-3
Ranheim - Troll 4-0
Troll - Brekstad 2-3
Verdal - Ranheim 2-1
Ranheim - Brekstad 5-1
Troll - Verdal 1-6

Norwegian Cup

Final

Northern Norwegian Cup

Final

European cups

Norwegian representatives
Fredrikstad (Champions Cup)

Champions Cup

Preliminary rounds
September 6: Standard Liege (Belgium) - Fredrikstad 2 - 1

September 20: Fredrikstad - Standard Liege 0 - 2 (agg. 4 - 1)

National team

Note: Norway's goals first 
Explanation:
WCQ = 1962 World Cup Qualifier

 
Seasons in Norwegian football